Markovo is a rural locality (a village) in Klyapovskoye Rural Settlement, Beryozovsky District, Perm Krai, Russia. The population was 121 as of 2010. There are 4 streets.

Geography 
It is located 8 km south-east from Beryozovka.

References 

Rural localities in Beryozovsky District, Perm Krai